Galacia is a misspelling. The correct spelling might be:

 Galicia (disambiguation)
 Galatia (disambiguation)

Galatia is an ancient city name for a region in present-day Turkey.

Galicia is a region in northwestern Spain.